The blue-crowned racket-tail (Prioniturus discurus) is a parrot found on all the larger islands of the Philippines except Palawan and Panay islands.  It is 27 cm, basically green with a blue crown, bluish undertail, whitish beak, and dark underwings with green coverts. The blue-headed racket-tail (P. platenae) was formerly included in this species.

Taxonomy

There are three subspecies:

 P. d. discurus: Jolo, Mindanao, Olutanga, Basilan, Guimaras, Luzon.
 P. d. whiteheadi: Negros, Bohol, Samar, Leyte, Masbate, Cebu. Less blue on crown.
 P. d. nesophilus: Tablas, Sibuyan, Catanduanes. Still less blue. May be part of P.d. whiteheadi.

It inhabits humid forests, mangroves, and cultivated areas up to 1750m. Small flocks of 5-12, but more gather at fruit trees. Eats fruit, berries, nuts and seeds.  Widespread but threatened by habitat destruction and trapping for the cage-bird trade.

References

 Juniper & Parr (1998) Parrots: A Guide to Parrots of the World; .

External links 
 Oriental Bird Images: Blue-crowned racquet-tail   Selected photos

blue-crowned racket-tail
Endemic birds of the Philippines
blue-crowned racket-tail
Taxa named by Louis Jean Pierre Vieillot